Earl R. Flansburgh (April 28, 1931 – February 3, 2009) was a Modernist architect known for his extensive work in the Boston area.

Early life and education 
Earl Robert Flansburgh grew up in Ithaca, New York. His father, Earl Alvah Flansburgh, was a professor at Cornell University.

Flansburgh graduated from the Cornell Architecture School in 1954, where he was also a member of the Quill and Dagger society. While at Cornell, Flansburgh was manager of the freshmen's men orientation camp. In 1957, Flansburgh received a master's degree from MIT, and taught in London as a Fulbright scholar.

Flansburgh and his wife Polly both had deep ties to Cornell University. Both their parents were professors there. Polly's grandfather was a member of the school's first graduating class of 1869, which makes their son Earl Cornell's first-ever fifth-generation Cornellian. From 1972 until 1987, he was a University trustee, serving as chairman of the Buildings and Properties Committee. He designed the school's Campus Store and Builder's Wall; the store was honored with a citation by Progressive Architecture magazine in January 1969.

Career 
In 1963, Flansburgh formed the architecture firm, Earl R. Flansburgh & Associates (ERF+A) in Cambridge, Massachusetts. In January 1969, "Progressive Architecture" selected Flansburgh's underground Cornell Campus Store for one of its sixteen Annual Design Awards.  Under his direction, the firm won over 80 regional and national design awards.

Throughout his professional career Flansburgh also taught or lectured about architecture at institutions including Massachusetts Institute of Technology,  Wellesley College, and the Architectural Association School of Architecture (London).

Flansburgh received the Award of Honor for Lifetime Achievement from the Boston Society of Architects in 1999. His design of the Cornell University Campus Store was honored with a citation in Progressive Architecture Magazine in January 1969.

Personal life 
Flansburgh married Louise Hospital in August 1955. Louise went on to found Boston By Foot a not-for-profit group that gives walking tours of historic sites in Boston.

The couple had two sons, Earl Schuyler Flansburgh, born in 1957, now known as Paxus Calta, and John Flansburgh, born in 1960. Calta is an anti-nuclear activist; John is a member and co-founder of the musical group They Might Be Giants.

Earl Robert Flansburgh was buried by his family in February 2009 at Lincoln Cemetery in Middlesex County, Massachusetts.

References

External links 
Flansburgh firm website

1931 births
2009 deaths
20th-century American architects
Cornell University College of Architecture, Art, and Planning alumni